is a public university in Nagoya, Aichi, Japan. The school was established in 1995.

See also
 Aichi Prefectural University

External links
 Official website 

Educational institutions established in 1995
Universities and colleges in Nagoya
Nursing schools in Japan
1995 establishments in Japan
Defunct public universities in Japan